Margrave Philip II of Baden (born 19 February 1559 in Baden-Baden – died 7 June 1588 in Baden-Baden) was from 1571 to 1588 Margrave of the Margraviate of Baden-Baden.  He was the son of the Protestant Margrave Philibert of Baden-Baden and the Catholic Mechthild of Bavaria.

Life 
Philip's father, Philibert, died in early October 1569 during the Battle of Montcontour.  The 10-year-old Philip and his one-year older sister Jakobea were then raised by their guardian, their uncle Albert V of Bavaria.  Albert gave Philip a strictly Catholic education.  At the University of Ingolstadt, Philip was educated in the spirit of the Counter Reformation.

Philibert had promised his subjects freedom of religion, but after his death, this freedom was more and more restricted by his widow and his son, who were strongly influenced by their Catholic upbringing.  Even during the regency of his uncle and guardian Duke Albert V, the Catholic rite was reintroduced in Baden-Baden in the years 1570–71.  After he took up government, Philip's first decree was that all citizens of Baden-Baden had to visit church services, under threat of severe penalties.

Philip dismantled the New Castle at Baden-Baden (the one built in 1579) and built a more magnificent, Renaissance-style castle on the same spot. This increased his debts considerably. Philip tried to cover these debts by rearranging the commercial sector and increasing taxes. Thus, the economy of the margraviate gradually came to resemble a planned economy.

A dark chapter in the history of Baden-Baden are the witch-hunts, that took place during his reign.  They began during the Bavarian regency, but their number increased considerably during Philips's reign.  The last witch hunt under Philip II took place in 1580; 18 women were burnt at the stake in the districts of Rastatt, Baden-Baden and Kuppenheim.

When Philip died at the age of 29, he left no descendants, and was succeeded by his cousin Edward Fortunatus, Margrave of Baden-Rodemachern.  Philip was buried in the Collegiate Church in Baden-Baden.

Ancestors

External links 
 http://www.bad-bad.de/gesch/philipp2.htm

Margraves of Baden-Baden
People from Baden-Baden
1559 births
1588 deaths
16th-century German people
Burials at Stiftskirche, Baden-Baden